Psilocybe ovoideocystidiata is a psilocybin mushroom in the section Stuntzae, having psilocybin and/or psilocin as main active compounds. It is closely related to P. subaeruginascens from Java, P. septentrionalis from Japan, and P. wayanadensis from India. 
This mushroom was first documented by Richard V. Gaines in Montgomery County, Pennsylvania in June 2003.
Although it is sometimes confused with Psilocybe caerulipes, it can be distinguished by its rhomboid spores, larger stature, earlier fruiting season and membranous annulus.

Etymology
From the abundant ovoid pleurocystidia and cheilocystidia.

Description 
Cap: (1) 1.5 — 5 (8) cm across, convex to subumbonate, chestnut or orangish brown to yellowish brown to pearly cream color, hygrophanous, glabrous, sub-viscid, translucent-striate near the margin, from slightly to highly undulated in maturity. During youth, the cap is usually highly convex and dark brown/black (the stem is white). During maturity, the entire mushroom becomes light-brown (cinnamon-brown when moist and light-beige when dry). Mature specimens often naturally exhibit blue-greenish bruising, and old, dried-out specimens are usually all black. Appearance may vary significantly  among individuals, depending on maturity and location. Flesh thick, pliant. Bruises blue and green where injured. 
Gills: adnate attachment and range from whitish to rusty brown, lavender, or dark purple brown. 
Spore print: Dark purple brown.
Stipe: (1.5) 3 – 9 (13) cm long by (2) 3 – 15 (20) mm wide, equal, somewhat subbulbous, hollow, base sometimes hypogeous, smooth at the top and often having small hairs near the bottom, colored whitish with irregular yellowish, brownish, or bluish tones. The partial veil is variable, ranging from a thin cortina that leaves a barely perceptible annular zone, to a substantial membrane that leaves a fairly persistent annulus. If a veil remnant is present, it is often found near the middle of the stem (unlike many other Psilocybe species, where it is just under the cap).
Taste: farinaceous
Odor: farinaceous to spicy
Microscopic features: Spores (7–) 8–9 (–12) × ( 5.5 – ) 6 – 7 (–8.5) µm, rhomboid to subrhomboid in face view, subellipsoid in side view, thick-walled, with the wall 0.8 to 1.5 µm thick.  One end of the spore has a broad germ pore and the other side has a short hilar appendage.  Two types of cheilocystidia and pleurocystidia are present.  One type of pleurocystidia measures 16 - 24 x 6 - 8 and is venstricose-rostrate.  The other type is larger, 20 - 40 micrometers by 12 - 16 micrometers, globose-pyriform, sometimes with a narrow apex and narrow base.  The basidia are 4 spored and measure 20 – 28 × 7 – 9 µm.

Habitat and formation

Psilocybe ovoideocystidiata  is mainly native to the eastern United States, in a range that stretches from Kentucky to Rhode Island, but has been found as far south as Mississippi. It is particularly common in the Ohio river valley.  Here, it is often found  along rivers and streams, usually in the woody debris of overflow areas, in man-made mulch and wood chips, and is sometimes found alongside of Japanese knotweed. It also tends to prefer shady areas and avoid direct sunlight. More recently, it has turned up in the western United States, in the Pacific States from Western Washington to Southern California, though it is still a relatively uncommon species in this region.  A relatively recently identified species, there is evidence that its range is currently undergoing rapid expansion, and it is frequently reported to appear in new areas.

This mushroom is typically gregarious, growing in groups of several hundred individuals in one particular area, as well as in multiple small clusters of several mushrooms each, within close proximity of one another. Solitary specimens also occur on occasion.

Seasonality varies a great deal depending on what region they are found in, but in the northeastern US, they are most common in the spring, from mid-April to late-June (peaking late-May), especially after periods of steady heavy rain for several consecutive days (a common weather pattern in the eastern US during spring). However, they may occasionally fruit as late as November.  These mushrooms seem to be very sensitive to the season and fruit chiefly in the spring; very little fruiting occurs during other times of year, even during favorable weather condition.

See also
List of Psilocybin mushrooms

References

External links
 Psilocybe ovoideocystidiata distribution map on Mushroom Observer

Psychedelic tryptamine carriers
Psychoactive fungi
ovoideocystidiata
Fungi of North America
Entheogens
Taxa named by Gastón Guzmán